Jalor City Football Club (Thai สโมสรฟุตบอลยาลอ ซิตี้), is a semi professional football club based in Yala, Thailand. The club is currently playing in the Thai League 3 Southern region.

History
The club was formed and registered on 4 August 2018 in Yala as the southernmost football club in Thailand. It initially competed in Thailand Amateur League Southern region. They were promoted to Thai League 4 in the end of season.

In 2019, the club competed in Thai League 4 Southern region and finished in the 5th place.

Crest history

Stadium and locations

Season by season record

P = Played
W = Games won
D = Games drawn
L = Games lost
F = Goals for
A = Goals against
Pts = Points
Pos = Final position

QR1 = First Qualifying Round
QR2 = Second Qualifying Round
R1 = Round 1
R2 = Round 2
R3 = Round 3
R4 = Round 4

R5 = Round 5
R6 = Round 6
QF = Quarter-finals
SF = Semi-finals
RU = Runners-up
W = Winners

Players

Current squad

References

External links
 Official facebook

Association football clubs established in 2018
Football clubs in Thailand
Yala province
2018 establishments in Thailand